Orkan-e Kord (also Romanized as Orkān-e Kord; also known as Orgān-e Kord) is a village in Khandan Rural District, Tarom Sofla District, Qazvin County, Qazvin Province, Iran. At the 2006 census, its population was 1,349, in 338 families.

References 

Populated places in Qazvin County